Morbi district is in the state of Gujarat, India. It was formed on August 15, 2013, along with several other districts, on the 67th Independence Day of India. Morbi city is the administrative headquarters of the district. The district has 5 talukas - Morbi, Maliya, Tankara, Wankaner (previously in Rajkot district) and Halvad (previously in Surendranagar district). Morbi city is the administrative headquarters of Morbi district. The town of Morbi is situated on the Machchhu River, 35 km from the sea and 60 km from Rajkot. As per 2011 census data, the city had a  population  of 2,10,451 and average literacy rate of 83.64%.

This district is surrounded by Kutch district to the north, Surendranagar district to the east, Rajkot district to the south and Jamnagar district to the west.

Etymology
The district is named after Morbi city. The name of the city of Morbi (literally meaning the city of peacocks) was probably derived from the King of Bhuj.

History 
The district was formed from 4 taluks formerly in Rajkot district (Morbi, Maliya, Tankara, Wankaner) and Halvad taluk, formerly in Surendranagar district.

Demographics

Morbi district has an approx. population of 9,60,329, of which 358,420 (37.32%) lived in urban areas. Morbi district has an area of approx. 4,871.5 km2. and a density of 207 persons/sq km. The district had a sex ratio of 941 females per 1000 males. Scheduled Castes and Scheduled Tribes are 65,698 (6.84%) and 5,159 (0.54%) of the population respectively.

808,967 (84.24%) were Hindus, 143,925 (14.99%) were Muslims and 5,607 (0.58%) Jains.

At the time of the 2011 census, 97.28% of the population spoke Gujarati, 0.96% Hindi and 0.90% Marathi as their first language.

Taluks 
Morbi district consists of the following five talukas.

Politics
  

|}

Transport
Morbi district is connected by national highway. It has two railway junctions, Wankaner and Maliya-Miyana. Morbi railway station lies on the track connecting these two junctions.

References

External links 

 Official website

 
Districts of Gujarat
2013 establishments in Gujarat